The University of Kansas Health System, commonly known as KU Med and formerly known as The University of Kansas Hospital, is a nonprofit, academic medical center located in Kansas City, Kansas, United States, with branch hospitals and education centers in Topeka, Kansas, Great Bend, Kansas, and Lawrence, Kansas. It is the region's only nationally verified Level I Trauma Center. In 1998, it became an independent entity that receives no funding from the state of Kansas. The hospital is affiliated with the University of Kansas Medical Center, which comprises the schools of medicine, nursing and allied health. The University of Kansas Health System combines education, research and patient care. Physicians represent more than 200 specialties.

The center has 910 staffed beds; per year, there are 298,920 outpatient visits, 27,380 inpatient admissions and 47,771 emergency department visits. The center performs annually 10,124 inpatient and 8,743 outpatient surgeries.

History
Originally a part of the University of Kansas, the School of Medicine in Lawrence began as a one-year premedical course in 1880 and then offered a two-year course in 1899. It became a four-year school on April 21, 1905, when three private medical schools in the Kansas City area merged: the College of Physicians and Surgeons, the Kansas City Medical College and the Medico-Chirurgical College.

In 1906, Dr. Simeon Bishop Bell donated the land and cash totaling more than $100,000 to establish the original Eleanor Taylor Bell Hospital, in honor of his wife. That same year, the School of Medicine moved into the hospital, located on "Goat Hill" in Rosedale, at what is now Southwest Boulevard and 7th Street, in Kansas City, Kansas. Basic sciences were still taught in Lawrence, while clinical studies were taught at the Rosedale facility. A School of Nursing was also established in 1906.

In the early 1920s, the medical school moved south to its present location at 39th and Rainbow Boulevard, and in the late 1940s, it was renamed the University of Kansas Medical Center. During the 1960s and 1970s, all studies moved to Kansas City, the School of Allied Health was established, and a new hospital officially opened in 1979.

In 1998, the hospital became an independent Hospital Authority, serving as an instrumentality of the state and University of Kansas Medical Center and receiving no state funding. The hospital's official name is "The University of Kansas Health System" as it now incorporates more than 80 campuses across the Kansas City Metro.

A sixth-floor was added to the hospital in 2003 to meet a growing demand for patient services. An expanded and renovated Cancer Center and new Breast Center, both featuring the latest technology and many patient amenities, opened that same year. Also in 2003, construction began on the Center for Advanced Heart Care, an expertly designed cardiac complex focused on serving the needs of patients and families, from curbside to bedside.

The Health System has partnered with the Kansas City Chiefs and the Kansas City Royals to provide healthcare.

Awards
 2006–2018 — American Nurses Credentialing Center awarded Magnet designation to the hospital, the first in Kansas to attain this coveted status
2007 — U.S. Department of HHS awarded the hospital and its partner, Midwest Transplant Network, a third consecutive Medal of Honor for organ donations
2012–2018 — Since the award's inception, The University of Kansas Hospital has been ranked the best hospital in Kansas and in Kansas City by U.S. News & World Report's America's Best Hospitals.
2017–2018 — U.S. News & World Report's America's Best Hospitals ranked the hospital in the top 50 in 8 major specialties, including Cancer, Cardiology and Heart Surgery and Neurology and Neurosurgery.
 2018 — Modern Healthcare named the hospital among the Best Places to Work in Healthcare
 2018 — American Hospital Association's Hospitals & Health Networks magazine ranked the hospital among the nation's 100 Most Wired hospitals
2018 – AHIMA Grace Award Honorable Mention for leveraging analytics to improve clinical documentation and patient care

Cancer care
The University of Kansas Cancer Center earned the  Outstanding Achievement Award for exceptional quality from the American College of Surgeons Commission on Cancer in 2007.  The outpatient Richard and Annette Bloch Cancer Care Pavilion is designed to provide advanced medical care. The University of Kansas Cancer Center was awarded National Cancer Institute designation as a Comprehensive Cancer Center on July 12, 2012.

Organ transplantation
Hospital transplant teams have developed innovative techniques that minimize transplant trauma and prevent organ rejection. The hospital has one of the highest survival rates – and one of the shortest waiting lists – in the country for heart, kidney, liver and pancreas transplant.

Deep brain stimulation surgery
The University of Kansas Hospital and Medical Center were among the primary testing centers for using DBS to treat Parkinson's disease and essential tremor.

References

External links

 
 The University of Kansas Medical Center website

Hospital buildings completed in 1906
Hospital buildings completed in 1979
1906 establishments in Kansas
Buildings and structures in Kansas City, Kansas
Buildings and structures in Wyandotte County, Kansas
Hospitals established in 1906
Teaching hospitals in Kansas
University of Kansas